= Megan Min Ern Ding =

Dressage rider and SEA Games gold medalist

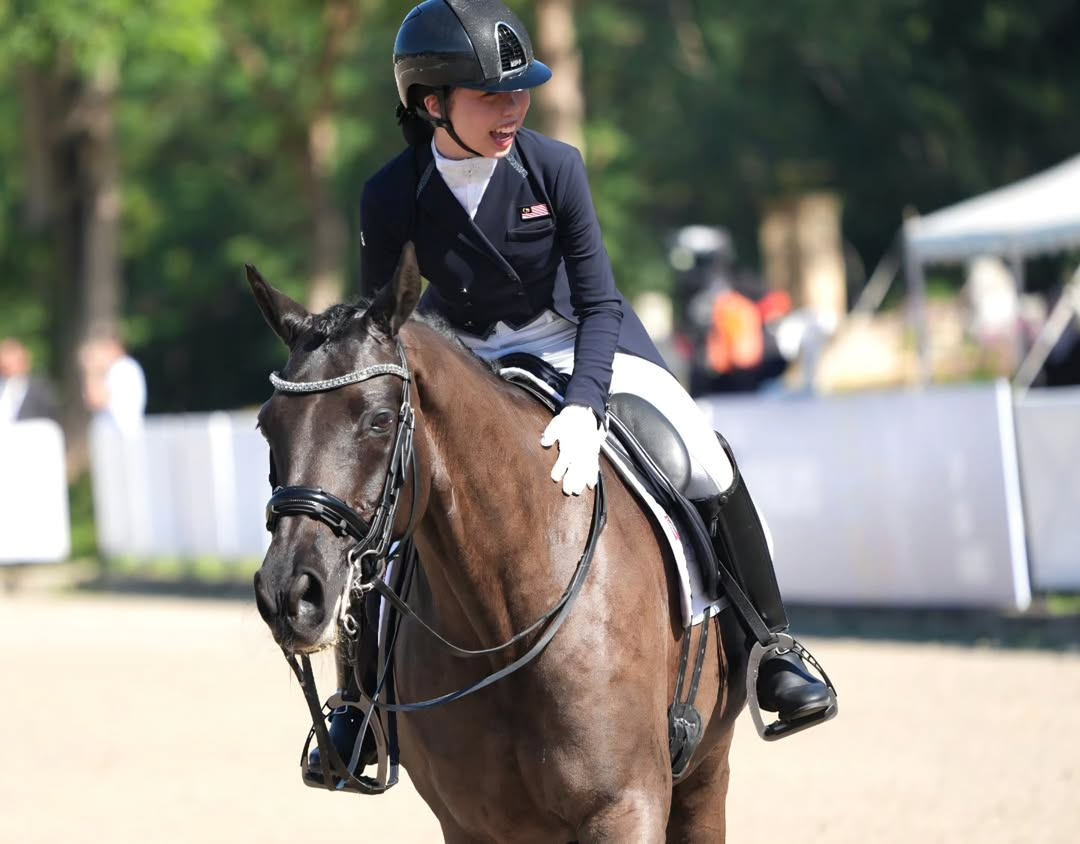
- Megan Ding at the 2025 SEA Games

Personal information
- Full name: Megan Min Ern Ding
- Born: 2 October 2008 (age 17)

Sport
- Country: (Malaysia)
- Sport: Equestrian
Medal record
Gold medal – first place	2025 Southeast Asian Games	Individual Dressage
First place	FEI Dressage World Challenge 2024	Intermediate I
First place	Spore National Dressage Championships 2024	Small Tour

Megan Min Ern Ding (born 2 October 2008) is a Malaysian equestrian rider who competes in dressage. Born in Singapore, she represents Malaysia internationally. At the age of 17, she made her international debut at the 2025 Southeast Asian Games, where she won the gold medal in individual dressage. In doing so, she became the youngest equestrian gold medallist in SEA Games history, and recorded the highest final score achieved in SEA Games dressage competition.

== Early life ==
Megan was born in Singapore and began riding at the age of five.

== Career ==
In 2024, Megan competed in the FEI Dressage World Challenge where she achieved the world number one individual ranking in the Intermediate I category, the highest level of the competition. She attained this ranking at the age of 16, becoming the youngest South East Asian rider and the first Malaysian to achieve a world number one individual ranking in this category since the competition’s inception in 2005.

That same year, Megan won the National Dressage Championship of Singapore, competing at the Small Tour level. In previous editions of the championships, she placed second at the Advanced level in 2023, and second at the Elementary level in 2022.

In the Singapore Equestrian League, organised by the Equestrian Federation of Singapore and based on results from federation-approved national competitions over a 12-month period, Megan achieved consistent success across multiple categories. She was awarded EFS Dressage Junior Rider of the Year, School Rider of the Year, and Rider of the Year between 2022 and 2024 while training in Singapore.
